Chris Sotomayor is an American colorist and cover artist. His work includes titles such as Captain Marvel, Avengers, Incredible Hulk, Captain America, Ms. Marvel, Deadpool, Supreme Power, and Marvel Adventures Fantastic Four.

Bibliography
 Incredible Hulk #109 (Oct 2007)
 Ms. Marvel #20 (Dec 2007)

External links
 Sotomayor's message board
 Marvel.com bibliography
 Chris Sotomayor's homepage

Comics colorists
Living people
1973 births